The Alfa Romeo Racing C41 is a Formula One car constructed by Alfa Romeo Racing to compete in the 2021 Formula 1 World Championship. The car was driven by Kimi Räikkönen and Antonio Giovinazzi, who returned for their third year with the team. Robert Kubica drove for the team at the Dutch and Italian Grands Prix replacing Räikkönen who withdrew from the events after testing positive for COVID-19. The chassis was designed by Jan Monchaux, Luca Furbatto, Lucia Conconi, Alessandro Cinelli and Nicolas Hennel with the car being powered by a customer Ferrari powertrain.

Development 
The car is an evolution of its predecessor, the C39. Development of the C40, Alfa's next-generation car, had already begun before the new regulations were pushed to 2022; the designation was retained, with the 2021 car adopting the C41 designation.

2020 cars were carried over into the 2021 season as a cost-savings measure due to the ongoing COVID-19 pandemic. To allow development, the FIA introduced a token system allowing teams to develop only certain areas of their cars. Alfa Romeo spent their tokens on improving the nose of the car, adopting a slimmer design to redirect air over the bargeboards.

Assessment and characteristics 
Journalists and technical analysts Mark Hughes and Giorgio Piola described the C41 as the most-improved car over its 2020 equivalent, calling it "both more powerful and more aerodynamically competitive than its C39 predecessor" due to a combination of power unit development by Ferrari and Alfa Romeo's own improvements.

Complete Formula One results
(key)

References

External links
 Official website 

C40
2021 Formula One season cars